Laughing Whitefish Falls State Park is a public recreation area protecting  along the Laughing Whitefish River in Onota Township and Rock River Township, in far western Alger County, Michigan. Its main scenic feature is Laughing Whitefish Falls, a 100-foot fan-shaped cascade located in the southern part of the site, in Rock River Township, eight miles (13 km) south of Lake Superior and three miles north of M-94.

Waterfall
Laughing Whitefish Falls is formed by an abrupt limestone escarpment of the Laughing Whitefish River, which flows northward into Lake Superior. The escarpment is shaped so as to draw out the cascade into an unusual fan-shaped wall of water. The falls is located within the Escanaba River State Forest, three-quarters of a mile east of County Route 327 (North Sundell Road). It can be reached by a half-mile hike through beech-maple forest. Foot trails also connect the falls to the North Country Trail, which runs through the north end of the park.

Activities and amenities

References

External links
Laughing Whitefish Falls State Park Michigan Department of Natural Resources
Laughing Whitefish Falls State Park Map Michigan Department of Natural Resources

Waterfalls of Michigan
State parks of Michigan
Protected areas of Alger County, Michigan
Landforms of Alger County, Michigan
Protected areas established in 1946
1946 establishments in Michigan
IUCN Category III